"Down Again" is a song by Australian band the Superjesus. The song was released in August 1997 as the lead single from the band's debut studio album, Sumo (1998), and peaked at number 23 on the Australian ARIA Singles Chart.

In January 1998, the song was ranked as number 14 in the Triple J Hottest 100, 1997.

Track listing
CD single (3984202032)
 "Down Again"  – 4:36	
 "Down Again"  – 5:17	
 "Blisterment" – 3:04

Charts

References

1997 singles
1997 songs
East West Records singles
Songs written by Sarah McLeod (musician)
The Superjesus songs
Warner Records singles